HaAh HaGadol 1 (lit. The Big Brother 1) is the first series of the Israeli version  of the reality show Big Brother. The show was first broadcast on Channel 2 on 1 September 2008, and ended on 16 December 2008. Erez Tal and Assi Azar co-host the show.

The show aired on Sunday and Tuesday nights. In addition to the main show broadcast on Channel 2, there was a 24-hour live stream on the HOT channel 20, and also on the Internet via Mako. Internet viewers could choose which camera images they want to view, while HOT viewers could only see camera images chosen by the Big Brother staff.

Sixteen housemates entering the house during the launch show and another four joined after 56 days. The housemates competed for a one million shekel prize. The housemates included a set of non-identical twin brothers and a father and daughter.

The house was located in Neve Ilan, a suburb of Jerusalem. The house was equipped with 50 surveillance cameras which were operated by the Big Brother in-house staff.

Housemates

Asher
Asher Simoni, A 29-year-old man from Tiberias. Asher's wife was pregnant when he entered the house and gave birth as her husband took part in the show. He first met his newborn daughter moments after his eviction on live television. He works as a clerk at a post office. Asher was mainly known for his strong religious views and his obsessive smoking.

Boris
Boris Schneiderovsky, A 22-year-old man from Ra'anana. His non-identical twin brother, Leon, also participated in the show.

Einav
Einav Boublil, A 23-year-old woman from Ashkelon. Her father Yossi entered the house as the sixteenth housemate, to Einav's surprise.

Eran
Eran Zilberman, A 26-year-old man from Tel Aviv. He works in the "high tech" industry.

Inna
Inna Braverman, A 22-year-old woman from Acre.

Itay
Itay Ziv, A 28-year-old man from Tel Aviv. He works in a circus as an acrobat. Engaged in a romantic relationship with Vanessa throughout the season. When Yoni entered the house the relationship between Itay and Vanessa broke apart as Vanessa was more interested in Yoni. After leaving the house Yoni got back together with Vanessa.

Jenny
Jenny Tukrev, A 23-year-old woman from Tel Aviv.

Keren
Keren Khasis, A 24-year-old woman from Tel Aviv and Herzliya.

Hagit
Hagit Ronen Maimon, A 43-year-old woman from Beersheba. She works as a jewelry store owner and jewelry designer.

Leon
Leon Schneiderovsky. A 22-year-old gay man from Ra'anana. His non-identical twin brother Boris was also in the house. Leon works at a clothing store as a salesman and is known in the house for his gentle character and friendship with housemate Einav and then with Shifra. He had a crush on fellow-housemate Shay early in the competition.

Miki
Miki Levin, A 31-year-old woman from Ramat HaSharon. She came to the house as the mean blonde woman, but after having fought with other housemates she was evicted.

Naama
Naama Friedmann, A 34-year-old writer from Liman. Her main goal in coming to the show was to promote her first book "Like There Is No Tomorrow". Naama was initially appreciated by other housemates, as they saw her as the caring mother housemate. But soon enough they discovered she was trying to manipulate people and pick fights. The housemates tried to vote her off but the audience brought her back twice. After failing to vote her off, she was shunned by the other housemates until she decided to leave the show of her own free will.

Ranin
Ranin Boulos, A 24-year-old woman from Neve Shalom, a village jointly established by Jewish and  Arab citizens of Israel, that is engaged in educational work for peace, equality and understanding between the two peoples. In the series she was chosen to represent the Israeli Arab demographic but being a professional actor opted to be more of a drama queen and trouble maker. Early on she made an impression that she was very emotional, and threatened to leave the show a few times after having fights with other housemates. After being evicted she concluded it was a once in a lifetime positive experience.

Shachar
Shachar Ben David, A 28-year-old bodybuilder from Kokhav Yair.

Shay
Shay Sheetrit, A 25-year-old man from Tel Aviv. He works as a manager in a bar. Due to a death in Shay's family the Big Brother gave Shay permission to attend his aunt's funeral for a few hours (outside the Big Brother house) so he wasn't present for his eviction on day 51.

Shifra
Shifra Cornfeld, The winner of "HaAh HaGadol", A 27-year-old woman from Jerusalem. She works as a flight attendant for El Al.  Shifra was born to a religious family and chose to leave the orthodox lifestyle and become a secular Jew. On July 26, 2009, Shifra was a phone-in guest on Big Brothers Little Brother, a spin-off of Big Brother (UK) and was asked questions on her time in the house.

Tzabar
Tzabar Gadish, A 27-year-old man from Binyamina.

Vanessa
Vanessa Allouche, A 27-year-old French immigrant woman from Bitan Aharon. She Engaged in a romantic relationship with Itay throughout the season. When Yoni entered the house the relationship between Itay and Vanessa broke apart as Vanessa was more interested in Yoni. After leaving the house Yoni got back together with Vanessa.

In 2017 she participated in France of Cash Island.

Yoni
Yoni Vinkel, A 30-year-old man from Arad. His father is a Dutch Christian, and his mother is an Iranian Jew.

Yossi
Yossi Boublil, A 56-year-old man from Ashkelon. His daughter, Einav is also in the house.

HaAhot HaKtana
HaAhot HaKtana (The Little Sister) provided a comedic criticism of all the events that took place throughout the week in the Big Brother House. The show aired several times a week on Bip (channel 6 on the HOT cable network), which presented a one-hour-long episode on Friday nights which starred the most recently evicted housemate. The show was hosted by Efrat Abramov and throughout the week previous housemates and well known entertainment personalities critique the daily events of the house. The program only aired during the first two seasons.

Nominations table

Notes

 On Day 2 Boris, Miki and Yossi were nominated and the public was given ten minutes to vote. However, a mistake coming from the production meant that only Boris and Yossi faced the public's vote after Miki's nomination was miscalculated. Out of Boris and Yossi, Boris was evicted and interviewed by the show's hosts. Once the mistake was noticed he was put back into the house. The nominations were re-held on Day 7.
 All housemates were automatically nominated for a special eviction on Day 28.
 Originally Einav and Asher were not nominated for eviction, but they tried to deceive Big Brother and send Tzabar and Shifra for nomination. Big Brother exposed the fraud and replaced Tzabar and Shifra with Asher and Einav.
 Big Brother gave Shay permission to attend his aunt's funeral for a few hours (outside the house) so he wasn't present for his eviction.
 Inna, Hagit, Shachar and Yoni were immune from being nominated because they are new housemates.
 Housemates nominated who they wanted to stay in the house and the three or more housemates with the MOST nominations were the only ones safe this Week.
 All housemates automatically faced the public vote this week, and for the first time, two housemates were evicted from the Big Brother house.
 In week 14, any housemate who got at least one vote, was nominated for eviction.
 There were no nominations in the final week and the public was voting for housemates to win, rather than be evicted. the housemate with the most SMS votes was the winner.

External links
 Official website 

2008 Israeli television seasons
01